Patrick Mathura (died ) was a radio and television personality in Trinidad and Tobago. He was with Radio Trinidad for over 40 years and hosted the first east Indian radio program in Trinidad and Tobago it was called songs of India in 1953. He was also the youngest mayor of Port of Spain. Then in 1962 he hosted Indian Variety Show on Trinidad and Tobago Television and it ran until 1995. Besides broadcasting he was in politics as well serving as the youngest mayor of Port of Spain. Finally by 1993 he hosted Indian programs from Sangeet 101 fm Trinidad and Tobago first East Indian radio station until very recently. He suffered intestinal problems and had to go through surgery. He died in August 2007.

References

Year of birth missing
2007 deaths
Trinidad and Tobago television personalities